John Cook may refer to:

Entertainment
 John Cook (filmmaker) (1935–2001), Austrian filmmaker
 John Cook (musician) (1918–1984), English organist
 John Kingsley Cook (1911–1994), English artist

Military
John Pope Cook (1825–1910), American Civil War general
John Cook (VC) (1843–1879), British soldier and recipient of the Victoria Cross
John Cook (Medal of Honor, 1847) (1847–1915), American Civil War soldier and Medal of Honor recipient
John H. Cook (1840–1916), English soldier who fought in the American Civil War

Politics

Canada
John Cook (Upper Canada politician) (1791–1877)
John Henry Cook (1902–1980), provincial politician in Ontario, Canada

Honduras
 John Arnold Cook, on List of members of the National Congress of Honduras, 2006–10

U.K.
John Coke (fl. 1390) or John Cook, in 1390, Member of Parliament (MP) for Truro
John Cook (fl. 1393), in 1393, MP for Newcastle-under-Lyme
John Cook (regicide) (1608–1660), English Solicitor General executed for regicide
John Cooke (died 1726), MP for Midhurst and Arundel

U.S.
John Cook (governor) (1730–1789), American farmer and governor of Delaware
John Parsons Cook (1817–1872), U.S. representative from Iowa
John C. Cook (1846–1920), U.S. representative and district judge from Iowa
John Cook (Texas politician) (born 1946), mayor of El Paso, Texas
John R. Cook, member of the Texas House of Representatives

Religion
 John Cook (Canadian minister) (1805–1892), Canadian clergyman and educator
 John Cook (professor, born 1739) (1739–1815), Scottish professor and a minister of the Church of Scotland
 John Cook (moderator 1816) (1770–1824), moderator of the General Assembly of the Church of Scotland 1816–1817
 John Cook (moderator 1859) (1807–1869), moderator of the General Assembly of the Church of Scotland 1859
 John Cook (Haddington) (1807–1874), moderator of the General Assembly of the Church of Scotland 1866–1867

Science
 John Howard Cook (1872–1946), British physician, missionary, lecturer
 John Manuel Cook (1910–1994), British archaeologist
 John Call Cook (1918–2012), American geophysicist
 John Cook (Australian author), cognitive scientist and creator of SkepticalScience.com

Sports
John Cook (coach) (born 1956), head coach of the women's volleyball team at the University of Nebraska
John Cook (golfer) (born 1957), American professional golfer
John Cook (Minnesota golfer), American golfer in the 1960s and 1970s, see Minnesota State Open
John Cook (speedway rider) (born 1958), professional motorcycle speedway rider, world finalist
John Cook (cricketer) (1946–2007), English cricketer
John Cook (rugby league) (born 1941), Australian rugby league player

Other
 John Cook (pirate) (died 1684), English buccaneer and pirate
 John Cook (reporter), editor-in-chief of The Intercept
 John Douglas Cook (1808–1868), Scottish journalist, founding editor of the Saturday Review
 John Edwin Cook (died 1859) participated in John Brown's raid on Harpers Ferry
 John F. Cook Sr., pastor and educator
 John F. Cook Jr. (1833–1910), his son, educator and civil rights activist
 John Williston Cook, American educator

See also
Cook (surname)
John Coke (disambiguation) (pronounced Cook)
John Cooke (disambiguation)
Jonathan Cook (born 1965), British journalist based in Israel